Springholm is a village in the historical county of Kirkcudbrightshire in Dumfries and Galloway, Scotland. The village has a primary school, which also serves for the local village of Kirkpatrick Durham. Springholm and Crocketford ( to the north-east) are the only two settlements that are not bypassed by the A75. The village is located in the historical county of Kirkcudbrightshire.

References

Villages in Dumfries and Galloway